Bousignies-sur-Roc is a commune in the Nord department in northern France.

In early 2021, the commune made international headlines after some historians on a walk noticed that a stone marking the French-Belgian border near the village was moved by about two meters into the French territory. Internationally, it was initially reported that the stone was moved by a Belgian farmer who was frustrated about the stone blocking the path of his tractor. However, the owner of the area that encompasses the stone, David Lavaux, is a veterinarian who claims that he never moved the stone.
In June 2021, YouTuber The Tim Traveller published a video showing that the stone has not been moved back since the initial report.

Population

See also
Communes of the Nord department

References

Communes of Nord (French department)